Cortinarius indigoverus is a basidiomycete fungus of the genus Cortinarius native to New Guinea, where it grows under Nothofagus.

See also
List of Cortinarius species

References

External links

indigoverus
Fungi of New Guinea
Fungi described in 1990
Taxa named by Egon Horak